Xavier Domenech i Sampere (born 1974, Sabadell), is a Spanish historian, activist and member of Procés Constituent. He led the En Comú Podem (Together We Can) electoral ticket that stood in Catalonia at the Spanish General Elections on 20 December 2015.

In June 2015, Domènech was appointed Commissioner for Strategic Studies and Historical Memory at Barcelona City Hall by the government of Barcelona en Comú. Barcelona en Comú's historical memory policies under Domenech have included removing the bust of former King of Spain, Juan Carlos, from the city council chamber, and denying the use of Monjuic Castle for a service in memory of executed Nationalist supporters.

He is the author of a number of history books, including Quan el carrer va deixar de ser seu. Moviment obrer, societat civil i canvi polític a Sabadell (Barcelona, 2002), Temps d'Interseccions. Una història de la Joventut Comunista de Catalunya (Barcelona, 2007), Quan plovien Bombes. La Guerra Civil i els bombardeigs de Barcelona (Barcelona 2007), Clase Obrera, antifranquismo y cambio político (2008), Lucha de clases, dictadura y democracia (1939–1977), and Political Change and the Labor Movement under Francoism. Class Struggle, Dictatorship and Democracy 1939–1977 (Madrid, 2012).

References

1974 births
Living people
Historians from Catalonia
Writers from Catalonia
Members of the 12th Parliament of Catalonia
Members of the 12th Congress of Deputies (Spain)